Mahlknecht is a surname. Notable people with the surname include:

Beatrix Mahlknecht, Italian luger
Erhard Mahlknecht, Italian luger
Ivo Mahlknecht (1939–2020), Italian alpine skier
Ulrich Mahlknecht (born 1967), German-Italian scientist

German-language surnames